Krvavi most (lit. "Bloody Bridge") is a street in the heart of Zagreb, capital of Croatia. It is named after the former bridge over the Medveščak creek, which was rendered useless after the covering of the creek. Although the bridge became the street, the name stayed because of historical reasons – as a reminder of history and a witness of Zagreb's past.

The bridge gained its name because of the constant conflicts happening on its wooden beams between the citizens of the two parts of Zagreb: Gradec and present day Kaptol.

Sources

History of Zagreb
Streets in Zagreb
Gornji Grad–Medveščak